This glossary of virology is a list of definitions of terms and concepts used in virology, the study of viruses, particularly in the description of viruses and their actions. Related fields include microbiology, molecular biology, and genetics.

A

B

C

D

E

G

H

I

K

L

M

N

O

P

Q

R

S

T

U

V

Z

See also
Glossary of biology
Glossary of genetics
Glossary of scientific naming
Introduction to viruses
List of viruses

References

Virology
Virology
Wikipedia glossaries using description lists